This article lists the main weightlifting events and their results for 2011.

World & Grand Prix weightlifting championships
 January 15 – ?: 2011 Grand Prix #1 in  Fujian
  won both the gold and overall medal tallies.
 May 8 – ?: 2011 World Youth Weightlifting Championships in  Lima
  and  won 5 gold and 9 overall medals each.
 June 29 – ?: 2011 World Junior Weightlifting Championships in  Penang
  won the gold medal tally.  won the overall medal tally.
 November 4 – 13: 2011 World Weightlifting Championships in  Paris
  won both the gold and overall medal tallies.
 December 17 – ?: 2011 Grand Prix #2 (President's Cup) in  Belgorod
 Men's 94 kg winner:  Andrey Demanov
 Men's 105 kg winner:  David Bedzhanyan
 Men's +105 kg winner:  Ruslan Albegov
 Women's 75 kg winner:  Natalia Zabolotnaya
 Women's +75 kg winner:  Tatiana Kashirina

Continental & regional weightlifting championships
 April 7 – ?: 2011 Pan American Youth Weightlifting Championships in  Margarita Island
  won both the gold and overall medal tallies.
 April 9 – ?: 2011 Asian Weightlifting Championships in  Tongling
  won both the gold and overall medal tallies.
 April 11 – ?: 2011 European Weightlifting Championships in  Kazan
  won both the gold and overall medal tallies.
 May 11 – ?: 2011 Oceania Weightlifting Championships in  Darwin
  and  won 3 gold medals each. Australia won the overall medal tally.
 August 21 – ?: 2011 European Youth Weightlifting Championships in  Ciechanów
  won the gold medal tally.  won the overall medal tally.
 August 25 – ?: 2011 South American Weightlifting Championships in  Valencia
  won both the gold and overall medal tallies.
 September 5 – ?: 2011 Asian Junior & Youth Weightlifting Championships in  Pattaya
 Junior:  won the gold medal tally.  won the overall medal tally.
 Youth:  won both the gold and overall medal tallies.
 September 10 – ?: 2011 European Junior & U23 Weightlifting Championships in  Bucharest
 Junior:  won both the gold and overall medal tallies.
 U23:  won both the gold and overall medal tallies.
 October 10 – ?: 2011 African & Commonwealth (Senior, Junior, & Youth) Weightlifting Championships in  Cape Town
 Africa:  won the gold medal tally.  won the overall medal tally.
 Commonwealth Senior:  won both the gold and overall medal tallies.
 Commonwealth Junior:  won the gold medal tally.  won the overall medal tally.
 Commonwealth Youth:  won both the gold and overall medal tallies.
 November 25 – ?: 2011 Asian Inter-Club Senior & Junior Weightlifting Championships in  Tashkent
 Senior:  won both the gold and overall medal tallies.
 Junior:  won both the gold and overall medal tallies.

References

External links
 International Weightlifting Federation Website

 
Weightlifting by year
2011 in sports